
Country Code: +52
International Call Prefix: 00
'''Trunk Prefix: none

See also
Telephone numbers in Mexico

References

ITU allocations list

 
Mexico